Nikolay Ivanovich Yakovenko (5 November 1941 – 22 December 2006) was a heavyweight Greco-Roman wrestler from Russia. He won the world title in 1967 and 1969 and Olympic silver medals in 1968 and 1972.

Yakovenko took up wrestling in 1958 and won his first Soviet title in 1961, in the welterweight division. He was included to the Soviet national team in 1967, when he moved up to the light-heavyweight category. In 1969 he won his last Soviet title, in the heavyweight division. He retired after the 1972 Olympics and had a long career as a wrestling coach and official. Between 1973 and 1980 he headed the Soviet Greco-Roman team, and after that coached at Soviet Army clubs in Rostov and Moscow. Starting from 1985 he also headed the physical education department of the Moscow State University of Railway Engineering. Since 2009, an annual Greco-Roman wrestling tournament has been held in Rostov in his honor.

References

External links
 

1941 births
2006 deaths
Olympic wrestlers of the Soviet Union
Wrestlers at the 1968 Summer Olympics
Wrestlers at the 1972 Summer Olympics
Russian male sport wrestlers
Olympic silver medalists for the Soviet Union
Olympic medalists in wrestling
Medalists at the 1972 Summer Olympics
Medalists at the 1968 Summer Olympics
People from Azovsky District
Sportspeople from Rostov Oblast